The R130 road is a regional road in Fingal, Ireland.

The official description of the R130 from the Roads Act 1993 (Classification of Regional Roads) Order 2012  reads:

R130: Coolquoy Common - Grallagh, County Dublin

Between its junction with R135 at Coolquoy Common in the county of Fingal and its junction with R122 at Grallagh in the county of Fingal via Thorntown in the county of Fingal: Greenoge in the county of Meath: Fieldstown, Palmerstown, Nutstown; Fieldstown — Garristown — Ardcath Road and Grallagh Road at Garristown; and Baldwinstown in the county of Fingal.

See also
Roads in Ireland
National primary road
National secondary road
Regional road

References

Regional roads in the Republic of Ireland
Roads in Fingal